Igor Sokolov (born January 2, 1958) is a former Soviet sport shooter and Olympic champion.

He received a gold medal in 50 m Running Target at the 1980 Summer Olympics in Moscow.

References

1958 births
Living people
Russian male sport shooters
Soviet male sport shooters
Running target shooters
Olympic shooters of the Soviet Union
Shooters at the 1980 Summer Olympics
Olympic gold medalists for the Soviet Union
Olympic medalists in shooting

Medalists at the 1980 Summer Olympics